The Empire State Games are a set of annual Olympic-style competitions for amateur athletes from the state of New York, encompassing several divisions and allowing athletes of all ages to compete.  It was a member of the National Congress of State Games.  The games consisted of a number of competitions:
Summer Games (often referred to as the Empire State Games, typically held in late July)
Winter Games (often referred to as the Empire State Winter Games, typically held in February)
Games for the Physically Challenged (similar to the Paralympics)
Senior Games (specifically for athletes age 50 and older)

In 2009, 2011, 2012 and 2013 the Empire State Summer Games were cancelled.

History

Early history 
One of the original organizers of the Empire State Games was Herbert Mols of Buffalo, New York. (https://www.youtube.com/watch?v=RU__5V9RAcc0) The first Empire State Games took place at Syracuse University in 1978, the first state games to be held in the United States. The games remained in Syracuse until a delegation from Western New York led by Herbert Mols, Bob Rich, Bob Bedell, Carl Roesch Sr., Dr. Marc Grosso, Gardner Debo, Mark Sternin and Ed Rutkowski brought the Games to Buffalo, New York in 1985 and 1986.

With the success of the first 1978 games, the Empire State Games have sparked the creation of other state games across the country. Before their cancellation, the Empire State Games were the largest state-supported amateur athletic competition in the nation.

The Empire State Games competition was a member of the National Congress of State Games, and was a recognized State Games Program of the United States Olympic Committee.

Cancellations 

The 2008 Empire State Games took place from July 23 through July 27, 2008 in Binghamton. The 2009 Empire State Games were cancelled.  In 2010 the games were revived and held from July 21 through July 25, 2010 in Buffalo, New York.

Due to a lack of state funding, the 2011 games were discontinued on November 17, 2010.  The community of Lake Placid was able to save the winter games. As for the Games for the Physically Challenged, they were able to be saved with the help of Nassau County Executive Edward P. Mangano and the partnership with dozens of private sector sponsors.

Return of the games 
In 2012 Empire State Sports Foundation (ESSF) was created with the specific goal of rejuvenating the Hugh L. Carey Empire State Games for amateur athletes of New York State. ESSF is a Rochester, New York-based not-for-profit public charity dedicated to the recognition and promotion of competitive excellence among New York State’s amateur athletes, as well as those attributes associated with sports: personal health, fitness, development, education, sportsmanship and teamwork.

The Empire State Summer Games were prepared to return in 2013, but as the ESSF were finding corporate partners, they discovered that corporate sponsors had "been giving any extra funds to Hurricane Sandy relief, leaving little extra room for other worthy causes". The Empire State Games are going to be re-launched in Rochester in the summer of 2014.

Upon hearing that The Empire State Summer Games for 2013 was cancelled Nassau County announced that they will hold the 2013 Games for the Physically Challenged as they have done for the last two years. In an April 2013 press conference, Nassau County Executive Edward P. Mangano stated, "The 2013 Games would not have been able to happen without the genius donation of $50,000 US dollars by NBTY, Inc. through their Helping Hands Charity." Known locally as the Nassau County Empire State Games for the Physically Challenged, the 2013 games took place May 30 through June 1.

End of an era 
According to media reports April 2014, the Empire State Sports Foundation (ESSF), a Brighton, New York nonprofit organization whose aim to revive the popular Olympic-style summer sports event fueled hope among amateur athletes and media attention across the state, official announced its intention to disband. According to the official papers that were made public, filed in New York State Supreme Court, show that the foundation is insolvent, owing debts topping $158,000 to multiple creditors.

Regions 
New York State is divided into six regions for the Empire State Games, and each region fields its own athletic teams through tryouts before the games begin.

Adirondack Region
Counties: Albany, Clinton, Columbia, Essex, Franklin, Fulton, Greene, Hamilton, Montgomery, Saratoga, Schoharie, Schenectady, St. Lawrence, Rensselaer, Warren, Washington
Cities: Albany, Glens Falls, Plattsburgh, Schenectady, Troy
Uniform color: yellow and blue 
Central Region
Counties: Broome, Cayuga, Chemung, Chenango, Cortland, Delaware, Herkimer, Jefferson, Lewis, Madison, Oneida, Onondaga, Oswego, Otsego, Schuyler, Tioga, Tompkins
Cities: Binghamton, Elmira, Ithaca, Oswego, Rome, Syracuse, Utica
Uniform color: light blue and blue 
Hudson Valley Region
Counties: Dutchess, Orange, Putnam, Rockland, Sullivan, Ulster,  Westchester
Cities:Yonkers, Mount Vernon, Middletown, Newburgh, Poughkeepsie, White Plains, New Rochelle
Uniform colors: green and yellow 
Long Island Region
Counties: Nassau, Suffolk
Uniform colors: gray and red 
New York City Region
Counties: Bronx, Kings (Brooklyn), New York (Manhattan), Queens, Richmond (Staten Island)
City: New York City
Uniform color: orange and blue 
Western Region
Counties: Allegany, Cattaraugus, Chautauqua, Erie, Genesee, Livingston, Monroe, Niagara, Ontario, Orleans, Seneca, Steuben, Wayne, Wyoming, Yates
Cities: Buffalo, Corning, Niagara Falls,  Rochester
Uniform color: navy blue and red

Summer Games 
There are three divisions in the Summer Empire State Games: open, scholastic, and masters. The scholastic division is for New York State residents who are 17 or younger as of August 31 of the year of the games. Some scholastic division sports have a minimum age of 13 years. The open division is for New York State residents who are 18 years of age or older as of August 31 of the year of the games.  The masters division consists of 11 different sports and their age qualifications vary by sport.

Athletic events

Open and scholastic divisions 
Open and scholastic events:

 Archery
 Basketball
 Diving
 Fencing

 Gymnastics
 Rowing
 Shooting
 Soccer

 Swimming
 Track and field
 Volleyball
 Wrestling

Open only:

 Boxing
 Bowling
 Cycling

 Canoeing
 Kayaking
 Sailing

 Judo
 Softball
 Weightlifting
 Synchronized swimming

Scholastic only:

 Baseball
 Field hockey

 Ice hockey
 Lacrosse

 Tennis

Masters division 

The Masters division competes separately from the open and scholastic divisions, but has many of the same events.

 Archery
 Bowling
 Canoeing
 Cycling

 Diving
 Fencing
 Golf
 Gymnastics

 Rugby
 Swimming
 Volleyball

Host cities 

Syracuse played host to the first seven of the games, and in total has hosted the Empire State Games 12 times.  Other cities hosting multiple times include Buffalo (4 times), Albany (3 times), Binghamton (3 times), Rochester (3 times) and Ithaca (2 times).

Winter Games 
The Empire State Winter Games are held annually in Lake Placid in the month of February. Most of the events take place at the venues of the 1980 Winter Olympics.

Events 

 Alpine skiing
 Snowboarding
 Ski cross
 Boardercross
 Biathlon

 Bobsled
 Cross-country skiing
 Figure skating
 Ice hockey (women only)
 Luge

 Short track speed skating
 Skeleton
 Ski jumping
 Ski orienteering
 Snowshoe racing
 Speed skating

Games for the Physically Challenged 

The Empire State Games for the Physically Challenged is open to athletes between the ages of 5 and 21 in the following divisions: visually impaired, blind, hearing impaired, deaf, spinal cord injury, amputee, cerebral palsy, and les autres (which includes conditions such as muscular dystrophy, dwarfism, and arthritis, among others).

Events 

 Adapted Games
 Archery
 Slalom obstacle course

 Swimming
 Table tennis
 Track and field

 Wheelchair racing
 Wheelchair basketball

Senior Games 
The Empire State Senior Games is an organized sports competition and leisure program for those age 50 and older which: Provides recreational opportunities. Encourages fitness as a lifelong activity. Promotes the positive image of seniors. Combines sports and games with fitness, fun and fellowship. Advocates true competition in its purest form.

Events 

 Archery
 Badminton
 Basketball
 Bridge
 Cycling
 Disc golf
 Golf - Long course (par 71)
 Golf - Short course (par 54)

 Horseshoes
 Orienteering
 Pickleball
 Ping Pong (Table Tennis)
 Race Walk (5K)
 Racquetball
 Road Race (5K)
 Road Race (10K)

 Shuffleboard
 Softball
 Swimming
 Tennis
 Track and field
 Triathlon
 Volleyball

Notable Empire State Games athletes 

 Alpine skiing
 Diann Roffe, Western

 Baseball
 Andy Van Slyke, Central
 Michael Lynch, New York City, 1995

 Basketball
 Kenny Anderson, New York City
 Ron Artest, New York City, 1997–1998
 Walter Berry, New York City
 Sue Bird, Long Island
 Elton Brand, Hudson Valley, 1997
 Rick Carlisle, Adirondack
 Christian Laettner, Western
 Chris Mullin, New York City
 Sam Perkins, New York City
 Wally Szczerbiak, Long Island, 1997
 Dwayne Washington, New York City

Boxing
 Michael Bentt, New York City
 Hector Camacho, New York City
 Joe Mesi, Western
 Mike Tyson, New York City
 Hasim Rahman

Cycling
 Mike McCarthy, New York City
 George Hincapie, Long Island

Fencing
 Glen Moore, Western

Field hockey
 Tracey Fuchs, Long Island

Ice hockey
 Christopher Higgins, Long Island, 2000–2001
 Todd Marchant, Western
 Matt Murley, Central, 1997
 Vincent Tozzo, Hudson Valley, 1999-2000
 Rob Schremp, Central, 2000
 Dustin Brown, Central, 2000
 Lyndsay Wall, Western, 2001
 Stephen Gionta, Western
 Josephine Pucci, Hudson Valley
 Colin Reilly, Hudson Valley, 2010
 Mike Marnell, Long Island, 2010
 Jimmy Mazza, Long Island, 2010

Lacrosse
 JonJon Castro, Long Island, 1995
 Matthew Landis, Hudson Valley, 2010
 Douglas Jackson, Central, 1992
 Ric Beardsley, Hudson Valley, 1988, 1989, 1990 

Shooting
 Sandra Fong, Long Island
 Thrine Kane, Long Island
 Jimmie Perrin, Western, 1995–2010
 Michael Sylves, Western
 Jason Turner, Western
 Thomas White, Hudson Valley, 1978–2010

  Skeleton
 Jimmy Shea, Adirondack
 Gary Wozniak, Los Gatos, CA

 Soccer
 Angela Yvonne Coniglio Western and Central
 Jerrod Laventure, Long Island
 Ian Seidenberg, New York City
 Brian Minichillo, Central
 Abby Wambach, Western

 Swimming
 Kara Lynn Joyce, Western

 Wrestling
 Jeff Blatnick, Adirondack

Gymnastics John Orosco, New York City

References

External links 
 Empire State Summer Games
 Empire State Winter Games
 Games for the Physically Challenged

1978 establishments in New York (state)
Parasports organizations in the United States
Multi-sport events in the United States
Recurring sporting events established in 1978
Sports competitions in New York (state)